Akasaka (written: 赤阪 or 赤坂 lit. "red, slope") is a Japanese surname. Notable people with the surname include:

, Japanese manga artist
, Japanese cross-country skier
, Japanese baseball player
, Japanese diplomat
, Japanese activist
, Japanese writer
, Japanese competitive eater
, Japanese speed skater

Japanese-language surnames